UK Research and Innovation (UKRI) is a non-departmental public body of the Government of the United Kingdom that directs research and innovation funding, funded through the science budget of the Department for Business, Energy and Industrial Strategy.

History and role 
Established on 1 April 2018 by the Higher Education and Research Act 2017, UKRI brought nine organisations into one unified body. UKRI was created following a report by Sir Paul Nurse, the President of the Royal Society, who recommended the merger in order to increase integrative cross-disciplinary research.

Working in partnership with universities, research organisations, businesses, charities and government, its mission is to foster research and development within the United Kingdom and create a positive "impact" – "push the frontiers of human knowledge and understanding", "deliver economic impact" and "create social and cultural impact". The first Chief Executive Officer of UKRI was the immunologist Professor Sir Mark Walport. He was succeeded on 29 June 2020 by plant biologist Professor Dame Ottoline Leyser.

Research councils
There are nine bodies in UKRI, comprising the seven research councils formerly organised under Research Councils UK and two additional bodies, Innovate UK and Research England. Innovate UK had its roots in the  Department of Trade and Industry, while Research England succeeded the former Higher Education Funding Council for England. Research England is responsible for the Research Excellence Framework, or REF, and is developing a new knowledge exchange framework, KEF.

See also
 Advanced Research and Invention Agency

References

Sources

External links 
 

Funding bodies in the United Kingdom
Innovation in the United Kingdom
Non-departmental public bodies of the United Kingdom government
Research and development in the United Kingdom
Research funding agencies
Department for Business, Energy and Industrial Strategy